The Druk White Lotus School is located in Shey, Ladakh, in northern India, and is known locally as the Druk Padma Karpo School. Karpo means White and Padma means Lotus in the local language Bodhi.

About 
The school was started at the request of the people of Ladakh who wanted a school that would help maintain their rich cultural traditions, based on Tibetan Buddhism, while equipping their children for a life in the 21st century.

The masterplan and school buildings, designed by architects and engineers from Arup Associates and Ove Arup & Partners, combine local building techniques and materials with leading edge environmental design to make them effective in the extreme climate. In 2012, landscape architects from the School of Architecture, Design and Construction at the University of Greenwich began work on a landscape master plan and garden for the DWLS School.

The school offers a broad education, initially in the Ladakhi language and English.  Residential blocks allow children from Ladakh's remote areas to attend, and a programme of sponsorship ensures that the poorest are not excluded. It is managed by the Druk Pema Karpo Educational Society and financed with money raised internationally.

Druk White Lotus/Padma Karpo school is being built in stages.  The Nursery and Infant Courtyard opened in September 2001, and the Junior School in November 2004. Middle and Secondary School facilities were built year by year as funds permitted, with the last two secondary school classrooms completed in 2014. Additional facilities for residential students and the school are ongoing.

The school was featured in a 2007 episode of the PBS series Design e2, Cisco Systems "Human Network" advertisement as well as the Aamir Khan movie 3 Idiots. The school was damaged in August 2010 when cloudbursts caused flash floods that washed mud and boulders into many school buildings. The Bollywood star Aamir Khan made a special effort to lend a helping hand.

Founder, patrons and supporters

Founder
The Gyalwang Drukpa
Patrons
The 14th Dalai Lama
The 2nd Thuksey Rinpoche

Honorary patrons
Joanna Lumley OBE FRGS
Richard Gere
Dowager Countess Cawdor
Viscount Cowdray and Viscountess Cowdray

Supporters
The Yardbirds
Donovan
Peaks Foundation

Awards

The International Architecture in Stone Award, 2013:
The Emirates Glass LEAF Awards, 2012 for 'Best Sustainable Development': 
‘Test of Time: Environmental’ Award from the British Council for School Environments, 2012:
Design for Asia Grand Award, 2009:
Award for ‘Inspiring Design – International’ from the British Council for School Environments, 2009:
Australian National Association of Women in Construction, 2005:
Sinclair Knight Merz Award for Achievement in Development
British Consultants and Construction Bureau – International Expertise Awards, 2003:
Large Consultancy Firm of the Year 2003 (Arup Associates)
World Architecture Awards, 2002, (Arup Associates):
Best Asian Building
Best Education Building
Best Green Building (joint winner)

See also
 Tibetan Children's Villages

References

External links
The Druk White Lotus School.
Arup Associates article on the school and its awards.
His Holiness the Gyalwang Drukpa, school founder.
'A Visionary School Takes Shape in the Himalaya' by the University at Buffalo.
'Cisco Systems Human Network' microsite.
The Dragon Garden at the Druk White Lotus School.

Buddhist schools
Education in Ladakh
2001 establishments in Jammu and Kashmir
Educational institutions established in 2001